Dar Ghias (also Romanized as Dār Ghīās̄ and Dar Gheyās̄; also known as Dār Qīyes, Darreh Qanās, Darreh Qīās, and Darreh Qīyās) is a village in Babarashani Rural District, Chang Almas District, Bijar County, Kurdistan Province, Iran. At the 2006 census, its population was 256, in 66 families. The village is populated by Kurds.

References 

Towns and villages in Bijar County
Kurdish settlements in Kurdistan Province